A Bankart lesion is a type of shoulder injury that occurs following a dislocated shoulder. It is an injury of the anterior (inferior) glenoid labrum of the shoulder. When this happens, a pocket at the front of the glenoid forms that allows the humeral head to dislocate into it. It is an indication for surgery and often accompanied by a Hill-Sachs lesion, damage to the posterior humeral head.

A bony Bankart is a Bankart lesion that includes a fracture of the anterior-inferior glenoid cavity of the scapula bone.

The Bankart lesion is named after English orthopedic surgeon Arthur Sydney Blundell Bankart (1879–1951).

Signs and symptoms

Diagnosis
The diagnosis is usually initially made by a combination of physical exam and medical imaging, where the latter may be projectional radiography (in cases of bony Bankart) and/or MRI of the shoulder. The presence of intra-articular contrast allows for better evaluation of the glenoid labrum. Type V SLAP tears extends into the Bankart defect.

Treatment
Arthroscopic repair of Bankart injuries have good success rates, though nearly one-third of patients require further surgery for continued instability after the initial procedure in a study of young adults, with higher re-operation rates in those less than 20 years of age. Options for repair include an arthroscopic technique or a more invasive open Latarjet procedure, with the open technique tending to have a lower incidence of recurrent dislocation, but also a reduced range of motion following surgery.

Gallery

See also
Terms for anatomical location

References

External links

Bankart lesion - zadeh.co.uk

Dislocations, sprains and strains
Orthopedic problems
Lesion